Physics of the Solid State is a peer-reviewed scientific journal of solid state physics that publishes articles from researchers based at the Russian Academy of Sciences and other leading institutions in Russia. The journal is published by Pleiades Publishing and the online version is provided by the publisher Springer. It is edited by Alexander A. Kaplyanskii.

Abstracting and indexing
Physics of the Solid State is abstracted and indexed in the following databases:

According to the publisher, the journal has an impact factor of 0.895.

References

External links 
 
 Physics of the Solid State @ Springer

Physics journals
Springer Science+Business Media academic journals
English-language journals
Monthly journals